Tripuraneni is an Indian surname and given name of Telugu origin. Notable persons with that name include:

Tripuraneni Gopichand (1910–1962), Indian Telugu writer, playwright and film director
Tripuraneni Maharadhi (1930–2011), Indian Telugu film, screenplay, dialogue and script writer
Tripuraneni Ramaswamy (1887–1943), Indian Telugu lawyer, playwright, and reformer
Tripuraneni Varaprasad, Indian Telugu actor, film maker, son of Tripuraneni Maharadhi

See also
21958 Tripuraneni (VU185), a minor planet discovered in 1999

Surnames of Indian origin
Telugu-language surnames